Lukas Vejdemo (born 25 January 1996) is a Swedish professional ice hockey forward currently playing for Djurgårdens IF in the HockeyAllsvenskan (Allsv). He was selected by the Montreal Canadiens in the third round, 87th overall, of the 2015 NHL Entry Draft.

Playing career
Vejdemo made his Swedish Hockey League debut playing with Djurgårdens IF during the 2014–15 SHL season. Following the campaign, the Montreal Canadiens selected Vejdemo in the third round (87th overall) during the 2015 NHL Entry Draft.

In the 2017–18 season, Vejdemo established career-highs of 10 goals and 22 assists in 47 games. On 2 May 2018, the Canadiens signed him to a two-year, entry-level contract. Vejdemo spent the 2018-19 season with the Canadiens' American Hockey League (AHL) affiliate, the Laval Rocket. In 66 games, he recorded 13 goals and 16 assists for 29 points.

On 31 December 2019, Vejdemo made his NHL debut in a 3-1 loss to the Carolina Hurricanes. On 10 March 2020, he scored his first career NHL goal in a 4-2 loss to the Nashville Predators. Vejdemo finished the season with seven appearances for the Canadiens, as well as 47 for the Rocket.

On 4 September 2020, the Canadiens re-signed Vejdemo to a one-year, two-way contract extension. Two days later, the team loaned him to Södertälje SK of HockeyAllsvenskan, with the expectation he would return to North America to attend the Canadiens' and Rocket's training camps for the 2020–21 season.

Following the  season, after three seasons within the Canadiens organization, Vejdemo left as free agent. Having suffered a serious injury during the AHL playoff run with the Rocket, Vejdemo underwent surgery going un-signed into the 2022–23 season. In recovering from injury, Vejdemo belatedly signed an optional two-year contract in a return to hometown club, Djurgårdens IF, of the now HockeyAllsvenskan on 8 February 2023.

Career statistics

References

External links

1996 births
Living people
Djurgårdens IF Hockey players
Laval Rocket players
Montreal Canadiens draft picks
Montreal Canadiens players
Södertälje SK players
Ice hockey people from Stockholm
Swedish ice hockey centres